Biloxi Lighthouse is a lighthouse in Biloxi, Mississippi, adjacent to the Mississippi Sound of the Gulf of Mexico. The lighthouse has been maintained by female keepers for more years than any other lighthouse in the United States. It was listed on the National Register of Historic Places in 1973 and declared a Mississippi Landmark in 1987.

Authorization and construction

On March 3, 1847, the United States Congress authorized $12,000 for the construction of a lighthouse at Biloxi. The United States Department of the Treasury structured a contract, dated October 15, 1847, to the Baltimore foundry of Murray and Hazlehurst to build an iron lighthouse for $6,347. The keeper's house was contracted separately. The Collector at Mobile, Alabama, purchased the site. The tower was completed and placed in operation in 1848. The first keeper was Marcellus J. Howard.

In service
Mary Reynolds, with a "large family of orphan children" was appointed keeper on April 11, 1854. She remained in service until the U.S. Civil War. She owed her appointment to Governor Albert Gallatin Brown. In 1856 the light was "refitted."

In 1860 a hurricane swept the coast and destroyed many lighthouses, but the Biloxi Lighthouse remained undamaged. Keeper Reynolds reported that she kept the light burning through the storm and "faithfully performed the duties of Light Keeper in storm and sunshine attending it. I ascended the Tower at and after the last destructive storm when man stood appalled at the danger I encountered." During a storm in 1860, a portion of the sand under the lighthouse eroded, causing the structure to lean. Later more sand was removed from the opposite side to correct this. Local authorities ordered that the light be extinguished on June 18, 1861. The light was repaired and returned to service by November 15, 1866. At that time the tower was reported to have been painted with coal tar to protect it from rust, not, as has been reported, to mourn the assassination of President Abraham Lincoln. 

Perry Younghans was appointed keeper on November 14, 1866, but fell ill soon thereafter. His wife, Maria Younghans, took over and tended the light. When Mr. Younghans died, Mrs. Younghans was appointed keeper December 6, 1867. In 1868 the tower was painted white and almost fell during a hurricane that year. In 1880 the old keeper's house was razed and rebuilt. The seawall was washed away and the tower was threatened during a hurricane on October 1, 1893. The New Orleans Daily Picayune of October 21, 1893, noted that "At Biloxi Mrs. Younghans, the plucky woman who was in charge of the light, kept a light going all through the storm notwithstanding the fact that there were several feet of water in the room where she lived."

In 1898, a telephone cable was laid by Reese Hutchinson between the Biloxi and the Ship Island lighthouses at the start of the Spanish–American War.

In 1916, the light was again damaged by a hurricane, and the wharf and boathouse were destroyed by a storm the following year. Maria Younghans retired on December 31, 1918 and was replaced by her daughter, Miranda, who remained as keeper until 1929. The Younghans family had maintained the light for a total of 63 years. W. B. Thompson then took over as keeper.

In 1926, the station was electrified.

In April 1960, the beach near the light was the site of a "wade-in" to protest the segregation of Mississippi's beaches. In 2010, a civil rights historical marker was placed at the light to commemorate the demonstration.

In 1969, the keeper's house was destroyed by Hurricane Camille.

The tower is now owned by the City of Biloxi and is operated as a private aid to navigation.

In 2005, the lighthouse was damaged by Hurricane Katrina. Restoration was completed with a re-lighting ceremony on February 19, 2010. The restoration amounted to over $400,000; repairs included a rewiring, the interior bricks being redone, an instillation of exterior lights, and restoration of the surrounding decorative fence.

In popular culture

The lighthouse was featured on Mississippi's automobile license plates from October 2007 to October 2012. A press release from the Mississippi State Tax Commission, which designed and issued the plates, acknowledged the Light as "a building of historical importance" that "has long been recognized as a landmark of the Mississippi Gulf Coast".

Throughout its history, the lighthouse has survived a score of hurricanes, including the great storms of 1947 and 1969. On August 29, 2005, it stood against the wind and storm surge of Katrina. Inside the lighthouse, blue lines were painted on the wall to mark historic storm surges above 'mean sea level' (msl). Hurricanes of 1855 and 1906 reached 14.0 feet above msl, a 1909 hurricane crested at 15.0 feet msl, and Hurricane Camille's record of 17.5 feet was broken by Hurricane Katrina, which crested at 21.5 feet msl.

Tourism

The Biloxi Lighthouse is a beacon of welcome, caution, and hope to the Mississippi Sound. It is a symbol of survival, a storm veteran, a history maker, an integral part of the Biloxi Community and arguably, Biloxi itself. As a tourist attraction, and for tourists, though, the lighthouse is synonymous with more stories and photographs than actual experiences or visits. The language that makes this lighthouse famous is most often feminine, heroic and very site-specific. But the Biloxi Lighthouse, whose photograph is mass-produced, offers a tour that has been closed for the majority of its existence, and today, remains detached, respectfully set apart, and admirably independent from its city and its fans.

A crafted brochure and 12-minute video on the Biloxi city website provide a detailed history of the Lighthouse. What can be gathered from these advertisements is a deep sense of ownership. Twice, the narrator of the video, local resident Mary Ann Mobley, states that the lighthouse "lights the night, every night, with a flashing signal that spells Biloxi" and that "seen from the water, this flashing pattern means but one thing, and that is Biloxi." She calls the Light an "inseparable" part of the community. However, as Mitchell Schwarzer explains in his article Architecture and Mass Tourism, "The representation of a place, the images created for marketing, the vivid videos and persuasive prose of advertising texts, can be selective and creative as the marketer can make them—a reality check comes only after arrival."

Biloxi is the third largest gaming city in the country. "In the decade or so before Katrina," stated the Mayor of Biloxi, A.J. Holloway in 2007, "the people of Biloxi were enjoying the most prosperous time in our city's 300-plus-year history. Six billion dollars' worth in growth. ... visitors went from one million a year to between eight and ten million a year." This statement was written on a poster, entitled "We're reviving the Renaissance," with none other than the Biloxi Lighthouse in the foreground. This is just one example of how residents of Biloxi acknowledge the Light as a visual symbol beyond physical context; a symbol independent of anything the City of Biloxi has done or is planning to do simply because it has not changed, moved, or been destroyed. The city is making a new legacy for itself, but will no doubt preserve and restore the lighthouse storm after storm, not for profit but for inspiration or, as it appears, a crutch and subsequent identity in hard times.

In 2009, the landmark underwent a 14-month $400,000 restoration, finished in 2010 and according to a local newspaper, "saw nearly a thousand people ascend its spiral staircase on Feb. 21." The paper also claims the "tours of the historic 65-foot tall structure were popular before Hurricane Katrina struck in 2005. "If mass tourism, like mass media, is successful as a result of "a parade of hits driven by proven formulas," as Mitchell Schwarzer suggests, and those "formulas must be modulated from time to time," then the Biloxi Lighthouse has what it takes to draw crowds with every physical wind and water blown 'hit' it takes. It did not hurt the Light's reputation, either, when it became the only lighthouse in the United States to stand in the middle of a U.S. Highway (U.S. Route 90). Today, if you are lucky and at least 42 inches tall, you can climb the Light's 57 steps and 8-rung ladder, through a 19-by-23-inch trap door, into the light room. For those that cannot make the climb or trek across traffic, there is the reassurance that an image of the lighthouse, in this case, is more enduring than any specific visit.

Photography
The Biloxi Lighthouse, according to many Mississippi tourist sites, is one of the most photographed sites on the Gulf Coast. Photographed from the road or on it, tourists seek to capture the Light as it relates to them or as they wish to remember it. Schwarzer calls this type of encounter as one "connected far more to timeless celebrity than to historical geography." Therefore, it is ironic but completely appropriate that the lighthouse is featured on over 2 million registered Mississippi vehicles in the form of a license plate. The Light continues, this way, to be viewed quickly, taking on "the emotional language of distance and remove, somewhat like the aura of a movie star." This particular experience, enhanced by photography, is heavily protected by the city of Biloxi. "In the long running dispute with the city of Biloxi, Hayes Bolton," a Biloxi local business owner, "has been given another thirty day reprieve to install a proper fence to hide his Jet Ski dealership and pawn shop from the eyes of visitors to Biloxi's lighthouse."

The City of Biloxi has live footage of a view from inside the lighthouse posted to their website. It shows some of the Biloxi coastline and the intersection of Beach Blvd and Porter Ave.

References

External links

 Biloxi Lighthouse – Official Website
 Historical Marker Database – Biloxi Lighthouse

Lighthouses on the National Register of Historic Places in Mississippi
Buildings and structures in Biloxi, Mississippi
Lighthouses completed in 1848
Museums in Harrison County, Mississippi
Mississippi Landmarks
National Register of Historic Places in Harrison County, Mississippi